Harold Robert Maskell (17 March 1911 – 12 September 1972) was an Australian rules footballer who played with Geelong, Carlton and Hawthorn in the Victorian Football League (VFL).

When World War II began in 1939, Maskell volunteered for active service with the Australian Army. He qualified for the elite Commando force in 1942, and from then on fought against the invading Japanese Army in New Guinea and the neighbouring islands.

Notes

External links 

Harold Maskell's profile at Blueseum

1911 births
1972 deaths
Carlton Football Club players
Geelong Football Club players
Hawthorn Football Club players
Australian rules footballers from Victoria (Australia)
Camperdown Football Club players
Australian Army personnel of World War II
Military personnel from Victoria (Australia)